In cryptography, NewDES is a symmetric key block cipher. It was created in 1984–1985 by Robert Scott as a potential DES replacement.

Despite its name, it is not derived from DES and has quite a different structure. Its intended niche as a DES replacement has now mostly been filled by AES. The algorithm was revised with a modified key schedule in 1996 to counter a related-key attack; this version is sometimes referred to as NewDES-96.

In 2004, Scott posted some comments on sci.crypt reflecting on the motivation behind NewDES's design and what he might have done differently so as to make the cipher more secure.

Algorithm
NewDES, unlike DES, has no bit-level permutations, making it easy to implement in software. All operations are performed on whole bytes. It is a product cipher, consisting of 17 rounds performed on a 64-bit data block and makes use of a 120-bit key.

In each round, subkey material is XORed with the 1-byte sub-blocks of data, then fed through an S-box, the output of which is then XORed with another sub-block of data. In total, 8 XORs are performed in each round. The S-box is derived from the United States Declaration of Independence (used as a nothing-up-my-sleeve number).

Each set of two rounds uses seven 1-byte subkeys, which are derived by splitting 56 bits of the key into bytes. The key is then rotated 56 bits for use in the next two rounds.

Cryptanalysis
Only a small amount of cryptanalysis has been published on NewDES. The designer showed that NewDES exhibits the full avalanche effect after seven rounds: every ciphertext bit depends on every plaintext bit and key bit.

NewDES has the same complementation property that DES has: namely, that if

then

where

is the bitwise complement of x. This means that the work factor for a brute force attack is reduced by a factor of 2. Eli Biham also noticed that changing a full byte in all the key and data bytes leads to another complementation property. This reduces the work factor by 28.

Biham's related-key attack can break NewDES with 233 chosen-key chosen plaintexts, meaning that NewDES is not as secure as DES.

John Kelsey, Bruce Schneier, and David Wagner used related-key cryptanalysis to develop another attack on NewDES; it requires 232 known plaintexts and one related key.

References

External links
 
 NewDES source code implementations

Broken block ciphers